Hartola may refer to: 

 Hartola (Finland), a municipality in Finland
 Hartola (India), a small village in India